Ngā Toki Matawhaorua of Pewhairangi, often simply known as Ngā Toki, is the name of a New Zealand waka taua (large, ornately carved Māori war canoe).

It is named after Matawhaorua, the canoe of Kupe, the Polynesian discoverer of the islands now known as New Zealand; Kupe's canoe was later re-adzed and renamed Ngātokimatawhaorua. It was built in 1940 at the instigation of Te Puea Herangi for the centenary of the signing of the Treaty of Waitangi. It was refurbished by master waka builder and navigator Hekenukumai Ngā Iwi (Hector) Busby in 1974 for relaunching during the Waitangi Day ceremonies at Waitangi, Northland and has been paddled periodically since that time.

Ngā Toki can carry 80 paddlers and 55 other passengers. It is the largest canoe in New Zealand, measuring 35.7 metres (123 ft) long and up to 2 metres (6.56 ft) wide. It held the Guinness World Record for the world's longest canoe until July 12, 2006, when it was supplanted by a canoe built in Newport, Maine.

See also
Polynesian navigation
Hokule'a, Hawaiian double-hulled ship and voyages.

References

External links
 https://web.archive.org/web/20051101174103/http://maoriart.org.nz/about/committees/nga_waka

Māori waka
Polynesian navigation